Cristie Kerr (born October 12, 1977) is an American professional golfer who plays on the LPGA Tour. She has 20 wins on the LPGA Tour, including two major championships, and over $19 million in career earnings.  Kerr was the number one-ranked golfer in the Women's World Golf Rankings for three time periods in 2010. She is naturally left handed but plays golf right handed.

Amateur career
Kerr was born in Miami, Florida, and started playing golf at the age of eight. She had a successful amateur career, winning the 1994 Junior Orange Bowl International Golf Championship and the 1995 Women's Western Amateur. She was the 1995 American Junior Golf Association Junior Player of the Year. In 1996 she played in the Curtis Cup and was the low amateur at the U.S. Women's Open. She graduated from Miami Sunset High School in West Kendall, Florida.

Professional career
Kerr's first win in a professional tournament came in April 1995 in the Ironwood FUTURES Classic on the Futures Tour, which she played while still an amateur.

She turned professional in 1996 at age 18 after graduating from high school, playing on both the Futures Tour and Players West Tour. In October 1996, she tied for sixth at the LPGA Final Qualifying Tournament to gain exempt status for 1997. Her LPGA career started fairly slowly; she broke into the top fifty on the money list in her third season in 1999, but did not win until her sixth season. In 2002, she won her first LPGA event at the Longs Drugs Challenge in California. By 2004, she was one of the leading players on the tour, with three tournament victories, and a fifth-place finish on the money list. She won two tournaments in 2005 and moved up to third on the money list. She tied for second at the 2000 U.S. Women's Open, matched by her performance in the 2006 Women's British Open. Her first win of 2006 came at the Franklin American Mortgage Championship where she posted a tournament-record score of 19 under par. In 2006, she was the only American to win more than one event on the LPGA Tour, winning three times. She won the 2007 U.S. Women's Open, her first major championship. She was also a member of the United States Solheim Cup team in 2002, 2003, and 2005.

The hallmarks of Kerr's game are putting; she finished in the top five on the LPGA Tour in putts/greens hit in 2005 and 2006 and iron play. She was fifth in greens-in-regulation in 2005. In 2005, Kerr finished in the top 10 in half of the tournaments she entered, and ranked second in the LPGA in scoring average, trailing only Annika Sörenstam.

In 2010, Kerr won two of the first 10 tournaments on the LPGA Tour, including the LPGA Championship, which she won by a record-breaking 12-stroke margin over the second-place finisher Song-Hee Kim. As a result of this finish, she went to the top of the Women's World Golf Rankings on June 28, 2010. Kerr held the position for three weeks before Ai Miyazato again regained the top ranking by a margin of 0.0006 average points.

In 2015, Kerr won the CME Group Tour Championship by one shot over fellow American Gerina Piller and South Korean Jang Ha-na. That year she made 24 cuts out of 25 events, captured her 17th career victory at the Kia Classic and posted a 3–0–1 record at her eight Solheim Cup, helping the U.S. team to victory.

In 2016, she recorded four top-10 finishes, including a tie for seventh at the LPGA KEB Hana Bank Championship. She was also on the victorious U.S. team at the UL International Crown, where she posted a team-best 3–1–0 record. In 2017, Kerr recorded her 19th and 20th career wins, moving her into a tie with Laura Davies for 26th all-time on the LPGA career wins list. That year she also participated in her ninth Solheim Cup for the U.S., posting a 3–0–1 record, thereby surpassing Juli Inkster for the all-time lead in points recorded by a U.S. player in Solheim Cup history (21). In 2018, Kerr recorded two top-10 finishes, with a season-best finish tied for second at the Kia Classic

Breast cancer activism
Kerr is actively involved in fundraising for breast cancer research.

The LPGA and the Susan G. Komen Breast Cancer Foundation awarded Kerr the 2006 LPGA Komen Award due to her dedication to find a cure for breast cancer through the foundation that she founded called Birdies for Breast Cancer. Kerr donates $50 per birdie. As of August 2009, she has raised over $750,000 through donations and an annual charity event. Kerr created the foundation in honor of her mother, Linda, who has been her inspiration. The foundation was created in 2003, the year that her mother Linda was diagnosed with breast cancer. Kerr also founded Curvature Wines, which helps to raise money for breast cancer charities.

Personal life and off-course activities
Her parents, who are divorced, are both diabetics, and her mother had a heart attack when Kerr was in the ninth grade. After her weight peaked, Kerr began exercising regularly and went on a diet. By 2002, she had lost , and weighs .

Kerr made an appearance on an episode of the third season of Donald Trump's television series The Apprentice in 2005. In 2006, Kerr married businessman Erik Stevens. Kerr and Stevens maintain a residence in Scottsdale, Arizona. One of her sponsors is Mutual of Omaha, which donates money to her breast cancer research foundation every time she places third or better.

Kerr partnered with Pride Mountain Vineyards in Napa, California, to launch her Curvature wine label with the 2006 vintage. She has also launched a new wine venture, Kerr Cellars, with winemaker Helen Keplinger, beginning with a 2013 vintage. The label now produces Pinot noir and red and white Bordeaux blends. In 2013, she passed the Court of Master Sommeliers level I test.

On December 8, 2013, Kerr and Stevens welcomed their first child, a son named Mason, via a surrogate. Kerr welcomed a second boy, Griffin, on August 28, 2018.

On December 4, 2020, Kerr and her caddie Matt Gelczis were injured in a collision between golf carts before sunrise prior to the start of the second round of the Volunteers of America Classic at the Old American Golf Club in The Colony, Texas. The two were sent to an emergency room at a local hospital, and released later that day. Kerr withdrew from the tournament. After completing the first round of the 2020 U.S. Women's Open, in which she shot a 71, she described what happened: Kerr and Gelczis struck another cart head-on, having been blinded by its headlights, which the cart Kerr was riding on didn't have; she and Gelczis were using a flashlight to try and find their way to the driving range, where the other cart had been coming from. The two were thrown from the cart; Kerr landed on her chest, suffering three dislocated ribs, and bruising on her arms; in order to get through her first round at the U.S. Women's Open, she regularly took pain medication. According to Kerr, Gelczis's injuries were far less severe, receiving only a "bump on the head", and whiplash.

Professional wins (24)

LPGA Tour wins (20)

LPGA Tour playoff record (3–3)

Futures Tour wins (1)

^ Won as an amateur, top professional (Comstock) earned $4,500.

Ladies European Tour (1)

Other wins (2)
2010 (1) Notah Begay III Foundation Challenge (with Hunter Mahan)
2011 (1) Notah Begay III Foundation Challenge (with Hunter Mahan)

Major championships

Wins (2)

Results timeline
Results not in chronological order before 2019.

^ The Women's British Open replaced the du Maurier Classic as an LPGA major in 2001
^^ The Evian Championship was added as a major in 2013.

LA = Low amateur
CUT = missed the half-way cut
WD = withdrew
NT = No tournament
T = tied

Summary

Most consecutive cuts made – 36 (2002 Kraft Nabisco – 2010 British Open)
Longest streak of top-10s – 4 (2009 U.S. Open – 2010 LPGA)

LPGA Tour career summary

^ Official as of May 29, 2022

* Includes matchplay and other tournaments without a cut.

World ranking
Position in Women's World Golf Rankings at the end of each calendar year.

Team appearances
Amateur
Curtis Cup (representing the United States): 1996

Professional
Solheim Cup (representing the United States): 2002 (winners), 2003, 2005 (winners), 2007 (winners), 2009 (winners), 2011, 2013, 2015 (winners), 2017 (winners)
Lexus Cup (representing International team): 2007, 2008 (winners)
International Crown (representing the United States): 2014, 2016 (winners), 2018

Solheim Cup record

1 Kerr conceded the match at the start because of injury; Solheim Cup rules categorized this as a 10 and 8 loss.

See also
List of golfers with most LPGA major championship wins
List of golfers with most LPGA Tour wins

References

External links

American female golfers
LPGA Tour golfers
Winners of LPGA major golf championships
Solheim Cup competitors for the United States
Golfers from Miami
Golfers from Phoenix, Arizona
1977 births
Living people
21st-century American women